U82 may refer to:

 , the name of two German submarines
 , a Royal Navy sloop 1943–1959